is a retired Japanese weightlifter who competed in the light-heavyweight category. He won a bronze medal at the 1984 Summer Olympics, which was combined with the world championships, and finished sixth at the 1988 Olympics. He also won two gold and one bronze medals at the 1982–1990 Asian Games.

References

1962 births
Living people
Olympic weightlifters of Japan
Weightlifters at the 1984 Summer Olympics
Weightlifters at the 1988 Summer Olympics
Weightlifters at the 1992 Summer Olympics
Olympic bronze medalists for Japan
Olympic medalists in weightlifting
Asian Games medalists in weightlifting
Weightlifters at the 1982 Asian Games
Weightlifters at the 1986 Asian Games
Weightlifters at the 1990 Asian Games
Japanese male weightlifters
Sportspeople from Tochigi Prefecture
Medalists at the 1984 Summer Olympics
Asian Games gold medalists for Japan
Asian Games bronze medalists for Japan
Medalists at the 1982 Asian Games
Medalists at the 1986 Asian Games
Medalists at the 1990 Asian Games
20th-century Japanese people